The Huntress, also known as Helena Wayne, is a superheroine appearing in American comic books published by DC Comics. The character is the daughter of the Batman and Catwoman (Selina Kyle) of an alternate universe established in the early 1960s and referred to as "Earth-Two", where the Golden Age stories took place. A modern-day predecessor (and retroactive namesake) of Helena Wayne as Huntress with no blood-relation to Batman or Catwoman, Helena Bertinelli, was additionally co-created by the character's co-creator Joe Staton in 1989, originally intended as a reinvention of the character following the events of Crisis on Infinite Earths, before being retconned as different characters.

Actress Ashley Scott portrayed Helena Kyle / The Huntress in the 2002 television series Birds of Prey and reprised her role in the annual Arrowverse crossover "Crisis on Infinite Earths".

Publication history
The Huntress was created as a response to All Star Comics inker Bob Layton's suggestion that a revamped Earth-Two Batgirl be added to the lineup of the Justice Society of America. Penciller Joe Staton recounted how the character was designed: 

Staton also admitted that the character's costume was heavily inspired by the Black Cat. The title Huntress was borrowed from "relatively obscure Golden Age villainess" Paula Brooks. Helena's first appearance was in DC Super Stars #17 (November/December 1977), which told her origin, and then All Star Comics #69 (December 1977), which came out the same day, and revealed her existence to the Justice Society of America. She appeared in Batman Family #17-20 when it expanded into the Dollar Comics format for its last few issues. The bulk of her solo stories appeared as backup features in issues of Wonder Woman beginning with issue #271 (September 1980). These stories, almost all of which were written by Levitz and pencilled by Staton, tended to a noir style, with the Huntress typically combating street level crime rather than costumed supervillains.

Following the character's death and erasure from history in Crisis on Infinite Earths #12 (1986), DC created a new Huntress (Helena Bertinelli), whose costume and weaponry are similar to that of Helena Wayne, and whose adventures were drawn by Staton.

A trade paperback collection entitled The Huntress: Darknight Daughter was published in December 2006. It collects DC Super Stars #17 and stories from Batman Family #18 - 20, as well as the backup stories from Wonder Woman #271 - 287, #289 - 290 and #294 - 295. The cover art is drawn by Brian Bolland.

Post-Crisis Earth-2 version
Following 52 (2007), DC Comics superheroes' fictional world was newly established as a collection of 52 parallel-world "universes". An alternate rebooted version of the Helena Wayne character now resides on "Post-Crisis" Earth-2 and has appeared in Justice Society of America (vol. 3) in issues set on the parallel world of Earth-2.

Fictional character biography

Origin
Helena was born in 1957 to Bruce Wayne and Selina Kyle Wayne, and grew up enjoying the benefits of being in a wealthy household. As a youth, she enjoyed a thorough education, as well as being trained by her parents, Batman and Catwoman, to become a super-athlete. As a young girl she was amazed to learn that her father was the Batman and embraced Dick Grayson/Robin as her older brother. She also looked up to Alfred as a second father. After Yale College and Yale Law School, she joined the law firm of Cranston and Grayson, one of whose partners was Dick Grayson, alias Robin.

In 1976, criminal Silky Cernak blackmailed his old boss Selina Kyle into resuming action once again as the Catwoman, an act which eventually led to her death. Helena, deciding to bring Cernak to justice, created a costume for herself, fashioned some weapons from her parents' equipment (including her eventual trademark weapon, a crossbow), and set out to bring him in. After accomplishing this, Helena decided to continue to fight crime, under the code name "the Huntress".

Allies and enemies
After her mother's death, Helena moved out of Wayne Manor and into a Gotham City apartment. She soon found herself involved with the Justice Society of America (her father's old team) and formally joined the group in All Star Comics #72. Helena was also briefly associated with the superhero group Infinity, Inc., a team made up of second-generation superheroes, mostly the children of JSA members.

Helena also struck up a friendship with fellow new superheroine Power Girl, who was also a part of both the JSA and Infinity Inc. In addition to Power Girl, Helena frequently worked with Robin and with a new hero named Blackwing. Some of her foes were the Thinker, the Joker, Lion-Mane (one of her mother's embittered former minions), Karnage, the Crime lord, the Boa, and the Earthworm. Her lover for a time was Gotham District Attorney Harry Sims. Despite the fact that she proposed a partnership ("I nail'em, you jail'em"), their relationship grew difficult in that he knew of her secret identity and was constantly worrying about her safety. She briefly flirted with Robin who, cited her father's choice in looking for a wife, told her that a normal man would not be able to satisfy her.

She made several visits to Earth-One. Her first was in Batman Family #17, where she met the Earth-One Batman, Robin, Batgirl and Batwoman, and fought the Earth-One Catwoman, Poison Ivy and Madame Zodiac. Seeing in him her father returned to her, she took to calling the Earth-One Batman her "Uncle Bruce", and built a familiar relationship with him. As a member of the Justice Society, she participated in several of the annual JLA/JSA meetings, most of which took place on Earth-One. She also participated in the battle against the Adjudicator as part of the female force of multiple Earths led by the Earth-One Wonder Woman. Other heroines involved in this adventure included Zatanna, Supergirl, the Phantom Lady, Madame Xanadu, Power Girl, the Black Canary, Wonder Girl, Raven and Starfire.

Despite the fact that she did love her mother and became the Huntress to avenge her death, she secretly feared that she might follow in her mother's footsteps. Either fighting a demonic version of her mother in a drug-induced haze or fighting her mother's Earth-One counterpart (who had never reformed), Helena had a difficult time coming to grips with her mother's criminal career, even going so far as to seek therapy. Looking at her mother's Earth-One counterpart, she secretly hoped that one day that the Catwoman would reform.

Death in Crisis on Infinite Earths
Helena's last solo appearance was before the 1985 miniseries Crisis on Infinite Earths; her storyline ended with the Harbinger contemplating the coming Crisis.

The Huntress participated in the battle to save all Creation from the Anti-Monitor and while she, along with dozens of other heroes, succeeded in preventing the villain from erasing the universe from having ever existed, she nevertheless failed to prevent the end of the multiverse. While parts of Earth-Two, along with other Earths, were grafted onto Earth-One creating the Post-Crisis Earth, Earth-Two itself was destroyed. The Huntress was traumatized to learn that her Earth and her family not only no longer existed but, with history rewritten, had never existed.

Despite collapsing in her Robin's arms at one point, she galvanized herself for the last battle wherein she (along with her Robin and Kole) died saving several children from the Anti-Monitor's shadow demons. After Crisis ended, Helena Wayne, like her parents and Earth-Two's Dick Grayson, disappeared and was forgotten.

Her last appearance was in Superman/Batman #27, wherein Power Girl, whose memories of Earth-Two were restored, recollects an adventure she had with the Huntress in which they clash with the Ultra-Humanite and Brainwave, the Ultra-Humanite having briefly trapped Superman and Batman's minds in the bodies of their cousin and daughter, respectively.

Return in Infinite Crisis
Following the events of Infinite Crisis and 52, the multiverse is effectively restored and among those universes is Earth-2, complete with the Huntress.

In Justice Society of America (vol. 3) Annual #1, Power Girl is sent to Earth-2 by Gog. There, she is discovered by the Huntress who recognizes her as the Power Girl from their world who went missing after the first Crisis. In this new Earth-2, the citizens remember having been the only Earth in existence following the Crisis. The Huntress re-initiates Power Girl into an amalgamated Justice Society Infinity (an Infinity Inc. and Justice Society merger) and brings her up to speed on her life. Following the death of Alfred, the Huntress has become more estranged from her friends; Robin serves in the Batman's place as a global protector, while the Huntress protects the streets of Gotham. As all her father's rogues gallery have begun to die, an aged Joker makes plans to recreate Two-Face by scarring acid on the Huntress' would-be fiancée, D.A. Harry Sims. The Huntress attempts to kill him, and is stopped by Power Girl; the Joker's plan to take the Huntress out with him backfires, and he dies of old age and prolonged exposure to his own chemicals. However, the Huntress confesses to Power Girl that it is Robin she truly loves, but Sims' injuries leave her feeling obligated to remain with him as he suffered his burns after he had proposed to her, but before she had the chance to say "No".

The Huntress has not only returned along with Earth-Two but, as Helena Kyle, she has even been born into the mainstream DC Universe. Her mother is still Selina Kyle, though Helena's father is initially unknown. Many assume it is the Batman, but it is eventually claimed that the father was Slam Bradley's son. Despite initially quitting being the Catwoman to care for her, Selina ultimately puts Helena up for adoption under the Batman's arrangement for fear she would be unable to protect her.

A month after Helena is placed with a new family, the Catwoman asks sorceress Zatanna to erase her memories of Helena and to make her stop thinking of herself as a heroine. Zatanna refuses, because such an act would be cruel to both mother and daughter and because Selina was already on the path to becoming a heroine on her own.

The New 52

The Helena Wayne incarnation of the Huntress returned in the wake of DC's The New 52 relaunch with a six-issue Huntress miniseries that was released in October 2011. Alongside Power Girl, she later starred in a revival of the Worlds' Finest series, written by Paul Levitz and drawn by George Pérez and Kevin Maguire. In the Post-Flashpoint Earth 2 continuity, Helena Wayne was the daughter of Batman and Catwoman (Bruce Wayne and Selina Kyle Wayne). She was also the only Robin to her father's Batman identity and a more ruthless character than previously seen. As well as Catwoman of Earth 2, who dies in an attack on a Gotham building under crossfire, Batman of Earth 2 is killed along with that world's Superman and Wonder Woman during an attempted Apokoliptian invasion. Helena only adopts the Huntress identity after accidentally arriving on Prime Earth through a Boom Tube, along with the Earth 2 Supergirl who changes to her subsequent Power Girl identity several years later. The Worlds' Finest storyline explores how Helena and Power Girl arrived on the mainstream DC Earth and their attempts to return to their source Earth. It starts five years after their arrival.

DC Rebirth
In the 2016–2019 run of Batman penned by Tom King as part of the DC Rebirth era, Selina and Bruce reconnected and fell in love once more, with the two almost marrying. In the possible futures of the story called "Last Rites" (in Batman (vol. 3) Annual #2) and the series Batman/Catwoman, Selina falls pregnant with Bruce's child whom they name Helena. After Bruce's death in a flash-forward she helps her widowed mother come to terms with it and ends up becoming the new Batwoman.

The New Golden Age
A version of character is reintroduced in a flashforward depicted in Geoff Johns' one-shot The New Golden Age, which deals with never-before-seen characters being returned to history having been removed, changing the DC timeline. In a future scene, a young Helena is being stalked by "The Stranger". Late one night, Helena spots Batman in her home and stabs him, only for him to reveal himself as her father Bruce. Her mother Selena is furious, knowing that this will start Helena down the tragic road taken by various Robins in the past. Because of this, Bruce retired from being Batman. Further in the future still, when Bruce is murdered, an adult Helena swears vengeance, becoming Huntress. When Huntress and her makeshift incarnation of the JSA confronted the Stranger, he killed most of its members which also resulted in Huntress being sent back in time to the 1940s where Johnny Thunder and Thunderbolt find her body.

Powers and abilities
The Huntress is a highly skilled gymnast and is also skilled at hand-to-hand combat. In addition, she is an expert markswoman, with her trademark weapon being a crossbow.

Collected editions
In January 2020, coinciding with the film Birds of Prey, DC Comics published The Huntress: Origins, a trade paperback which was a re-release of 2006's Huntress: Darknight Daughter under a new title.

In other media

 The Helena Wayne incarnation of the Huntress appears in Legends of the Superheroes, portrayed by Barbara Joyce.
 Bruce Timm spoke of bringing Helena Wayne / Huntress into Batman Beyond as an alternative to having a "Batgirl Beyond".
 Helena Wayne / Huntress, renamed Helena Kyle, appears in Birds of Prey, portrayed by Ashley Scott. This version is based primarily on her Bronze Age comics counterpart and is the half-metahuman daughter of Batman and Catwoman, the latter of whom raised Helena without revealing who her father was until Catwoman was murdered by Clayface and Barbara Gordon took over raising her. Having inherited her mother's powers such as enhanced agility, strength, healing, and a sixth sense for danger, Helena forms the titular Birds of Prey with Gordon and Dinah Redmond to fight crime in New Gotham City in Batman's stead.
 Helena Kyle makes a cameo appearance in "Crisis on Infinite Earths", portrayed again by Ashley Scott.

Analysis and reception
Editor Paul Levitz justified the creation of Helena Wayne by a wish to bring more diversity into the comic books, for the ALL-STAR JSA group, and to give Power Girl (the only female in the groups at the time) someone to contrast with and befriend.

Reviewers Michael Eury and Gina Misiroglu found the character of Helena Wayne "intriguingly distinguished by her parentage". This incarnation of the Huntress "so enthralled DC readers fascinated by the heroine's lineage and motivation" that she was spun out into her own successful series. When the character was eliminated by DC's Crisis on Infinite Earths series, it "was too popular to fully jettison from the DC universe", leading to the creation of Helena Bertinelli as the next Huntress.

References

External links
JSA Fact File: The Huntress
Earth-2 Huntress (Helena Wayne) Index

Characters created by Paul Levitz
Batman characters
Characters created by Bob Layton
Characters created by Joe Orlando
Comics characters introduced in 1977
DC Comics female superheroes
DC Comics martial artists
DC Comics superheroes
Earth-Two
Fictional characters from parallel universes
Fictional archers
Fictional lawyers
Superheroes who are adopted
Robin (character)
Vigilante characters in comics